Chris Harvey may refer to:

Chris Harvey (ice hockey)
Christopher Harvey (footballer)
Christopher Harvey (poet)